The 1992 International cricket season was from May 1992 to September 1992.

Season overview

May

Pakistan in England

August

Australia in Sri Lanka

References

1992 in cricket